Can't Get off the Phone EP is the title of the Ophaned Records EP released by H2O.

Side A
 "Phone Song"
 "Salad Days (Minor Threat Cover)"

Side B
 "Bad Boys" 
 "Smokeys Last Supper"

Personnel
 Toby Morse – vocals
 Todd Morse – guitar
 Rusty Pistachio – guitar
 Eric Rice – bass
 Todd Friend – drums
 Mastered by Vicor Luke
Produced By Dean Rispler

External links
 Epitaph Records

H2O (American band) albums
1996 EPs